The Frauen-Bundesliga 2005–06 was the 16th season of the Frauen-Bundesliga, Germany's premier football league. It began on 14 August 2005 and ended on 5 June 2006.

Final standings

Results

Top scorers

References

2005-06
Ger
1
Women1